MullenLowe Group is a global integrated marketing communications network headquartered in London. It is a part of the Interpublic Group of Companies (IPG), and consists of four divisions: MullenLowe, MullenLowe Comms, Mediahub, and MullenLowe Profero.

History 
A precursor of MullenLowe Group, Lowe & Partners was an international advertising agency with an extensive network created through numerous mergers and acquisitions.  Lowe was founded in 1981 by Frank Lowe, and he sold the firm to IPG in 1990.

Another predecessor, Lintas, had a history stretching back to 1899, starting as the house agency for London soap maker Lever Brothers.  Lintas was an acronym for Lever International Advertising Services.

In 1996, Ammirati Puris AvRutick and Lintas merged, forming Ammirati Puris Lintas.

In 1999, Lowe Group merged with Ammirati Puris Lintas, to form Lowe Lintas & Partners. Eventually the company dropped the Lintas and became known just as Lowe & Partners. The Lintas name lives on with MullenLowe Lintas Group in India.

Also in 1999, IPG acquired a majority stake in Wenham, Massachusetts-based agency Mullen Advertising.  Mullen initially kept its name as an autonomous part of Lowe.

In 2015, MullenLowe Group was created when IPG merged Lowe & Partners with Mullen Advertising. Lowe & Partners was a network of agencies with offices around the world, while Mullen was based in the United States. Mullen CEO Alex Leikikh became the CEO of the combined group.

Lowe offices around the world changed their names to include MullenLowe. Some would use the change as an opportunity to shed old names. For example, the London agency DLKW Lowe changed its name to MullenLowe London.  Others chose to keep heritage names, such as the Indian operation Lowe Lintas which became MullenLowe Lintas Group. Lowe's digital agency Lowe Profero was rebranded as MullenLowe Profero.

The group launched its new branding in January 2016 with four main brands: MullenLowe, an integrated marketing communications agency; MullenLowe Profero, a digital marketing company; MullenLowe Mediahub, a provider of media planning and buying solutions; and MullenLowe Open, offering behavior-driven activation and shopper marketing.  At the time, the group claimed to have 90 offices in 65 markets with about 6,400 employees.

In 2017, the group purchased strategic communications agency salt Communications, which was integrated as MullenLowe salt, adding to its public relations capabilities. MullenLowe salt and MullenLowe PR were subsequently grouped into a fifth division, MullenLowe Comms.

In April 2020, MullenLowe Group merged its MullenLowe Open agency into MullenLowe Profero.

Organisation
MullenLowe Group has 90+ offices in over 65 locations around the world. The group's bundled operating model combines agencies with expertise in creativity, technology, media, activation, analytics and public relations. The divisions of the group are:

 MullenLowe, a marketing communications network focused on brand strategy, communications planning and through-the-line advertising, and which includes Indian agency MullenLowe Lintas Group, and US based agency MullenLowe U.S.
 MullenLowe Comms, which incorporates various PR divisions including MullenLowe salt, a strategic communications agency with offices in London and Singapore, and MullenLowe PR, a US-based public relations agency.
 Mediahub, a global media planning and buying agency headquartered in Boston. 
 MullenLowe Profero, a customer experience and digital marketing agency, which as of April 2020 also includes the former MullenLowe Open agency, which specialized in customer relationship management (CRM), shopper and experiential campaigns.

References

External links 
MullenLowe Group Site
Capacity Profile Design

Advertising agencies of the United Kingdom
Interpublic Group
British companies established in 2015
Business services companies established in 2015
Companies based in London